The University of Toronto Faculty of Law (U of T Law, UToronto Law) is the law school of the University of Toronto. The Faculty's admissions process is the most selective of law schools in Canada and is one of the most selective in North America. The Faculty has consistently been ranked as the top law school for Common Law in Canada by Maclean's since it began to publish law school rankings. The Faculty offers the JD, LLM, SJD, MSL, and GPLLM degrees in law.

Among its alumni are a Canadian Prime Minister, three Chiefs of Staff to the Prime Minister, two Premiers of Ontario, two Mayors of Toronto, and fourteen Justices of the Supreme Court of Canada, including three of the nine currently-sitting Justices (Russell Brown, Michael J. Moldaver, and Sheilah Martin). A number of deans at North American law schools—Columbia Law School, Queen's Faculty of Law, and Alberta Faculty of Law—are University of Toronto Law graduates.

The current Dean of the Faculty of Law (as of January 1, 2021) is Jutta Brunnée, an international and environmental law scholar.

History
The University of Toronto Faculty of Law was established as a teaching faculty in 1887 pursuant to the University Federation Act, which was proclaimed into force in 1889. An earlier faculty of law had existed at King's College between 1843 and 1854, but was abolished by an Act of Parliament in 1853.

The Faculty of Law was officially opened in 1889, with two part-time professors appointed at its inauguration - William Proudfoot and David Mills. The Faculty awarded LL.B. degrees to graduates of its program. However, the Law Society of Upper Canada at the time refused to accept the University of Toronto Faculty of Law as an accredited law school, preferring instead to maintain control over the profession by establishing its own school, the Osgoode Hall Law School. Thus, students who graduated from the Faculty were still required to complete a full three-year articling term and complete courses at Osgoode Hall in order to join the legal profession. As a result, the Faculty's enrollment numbers in the early years were relatively low.

It was not until 1949 that the Faculty adopted its current form. In the 1940s, the Faculty played the leading role in making legal education in Ontario into a modern academic degree course, rather than an apprenticeship.

In 1949, Cecil ("Caesar") Wright assumed the deanship of the Faculty of Law. He first had to resign his post as Dean of Osgoode Hall Law School, the seat of the Law Society of Upper Canada, rejecting the Law Society's apprenticeship model of legal education in favour of the University of Toronto's vision of a full-time legal education, hinging on the professional bachelor of laws degree and embedded within a university. Wright brought with him his colleagues John Willis and Bora Laskin, the latter of whom would go on to become Chief Justice of the Supreme Court of Canada.

Despite the Faculty of Law's academic program, the Law Society of Upper Canada refused to recognize it as a degree-granting institution for the purposes of accreditation. In the early 1950s, law students and their supporters petitioned the Law Society, and in 1953, a group of 50 student protesters marched on Osgoode Hall demanding formal recognition for the Faculty of Law. Finally, in 1958, after years of negotiation and discord, the Law Society began to give credit to graduates of the law school seeking admission to the Ontario bar.

Reputation and admissions 
The University of Toronto Faculty of Law has consistently been rated as the top law school for Common Law in Canada. The Faculty has held the number one spot in Maclean's law school rankings for Common Law since it began to evaluate law schools in 2007. In 2011, the school was ranked 13th globally by the QS World University Rankings in the subject of law, along with a few select schools from US, UK, and Australia. In 2018, the Times Higher Education ranked the Faculty the 10th best law school in the world. In 2022, the Times Higher Education ranked the Faculty the 16th best law school in the world.

The Faculty of Law has high admission criteria with an acceptance rate of 13.5% and a yield rate of 70.1%. The Faculty features a 98% yield rate in the province of Ontario, representing about half of the country of Canada's English-language common-law population. The median undergraduate GPA of students accepted into the J.D. program is 3.88, and the median Law School Admission Test (LSAT) score is 168.

Location and buildings

The Faculty of Law lies at the geographic centre of the University of Toronto in the downtown Toronto area. It is located at the corner of Queen's Park Crescent and Hoskin Avenue, south of the Royal Ontario Museum and slightly north of the Legislative Assembly of Ontario.

Falconer Hall
Falconer Hall is home to the faculty's graduate program, including offices and common rooms for graduate students, and four seminar rooms. The building was originally constructed for Edward Rogers Wood as a family home and named Wymilwood. It was temporary home of York University from September 1960 to fall of 1961.

Flavelle House
Flavelle House contains a conference centre, the Rowell Room student lounge, and staff offices. The building was constructed in 1902 as the private residence of Joseph Flavelle, and it was given to the University of Toronto upon his death in 1939. It backs onto Philosopher's Walk, which can be seen from many of the south and west-facing rooms.

Jackman Law Building

In 2011, the Faculty of Law launched a campaign to raise money for the renovation and expansion of Flavelle House, with a goal of raising $53 million. The new building is named the Jackman Law Building in honour of Henry N.R. "Hal" Jackman, who donated $11 million to the faculty's building campaign in 2012, the largest single gift the faculty has ever received.

The new Faculty of Law building includes the conjoined Flavelle House, Laskin Pavilion, and Jackman Crescent, with the Queen's Park Forum connecting them all. It is located at 78 Queen's Park facing onto the Legislative Building on Queen's Park and has a view of downtown Toronto's skyline. Construction on the new building began in the summer of 2013 and was completed and ready for occupancy in mid-2016. The structure can be seen both from the corner of Queen's Park and from Hoskin Street. The Faculty of Law building is situated across from Trinity College, Toronto, separated by Philosopher's Walk, formerly Taddle Creek. Its location was formerly home to Toronto's Industrial Age Millionaire's Row, with many of the buildings, previously serving as mansions, donated to the University of Toronto in the intervening century. It is next to the Faculty of Music and just south of the Royal Ontario Museum, formerly part of the University of Toronto.

The Jackman Law Building includes the faculty's principal classrooms, faculty offices, student services offices, faculty and student common rooms, the Rosalie Silberman Abella Moot Court, as well as the Bora Laskin Law Library.

The Jackman Law Building was designed as a joint venture between B+H Architects and Hariri Pontariri Architects.

Faculty members

The Faculty of Law has over 50 full-time faculty members, and about 640 undergraduate and graduate students. Its "Distinguished Visitors" program brings short-term visiting professors from the world's leading law schools to teach at the school each year. Past visiting professors have included: Zhenmin Wang, Dean of the Faculty of Law at Tsinghua University; Aharon Barak, former President of the Supreme Court of Israel; and David M. Malone, former Permanent Representative of Canada to the United Nations.

Among the permanent faculty members are many who are regarded as the leading scholars in their fields and who have also written many standard textbooks used by most students across Canada. These include Stephen Waddams (Contract Law), Ernest Weinrib (Tort Law), Kent Roach (Criminal Law), Hamish Stewart (Evidence Law), Larissa Katz (Property Law), Mohammad Fadel and Anver Emon (Islamic Law), Trudo Lemmons (Health Law), Edward Iacobucci (Competition Law), Anthony Duggan and Anita Anand (Business Law), Ayelet Shachar (Immigration Law), Martin Friedland (Legal History), Arthur Ripstein (Legal Philosophy), Benjamin Alarie (Tax Law), Carol Rogerson (Family Law), and Michael Trebilcock (Law and Economics), among many others.

Gord Kirke has taught in the Bachelor of Laws and Master of Laws programs since 1985.

Academic programs

The faculty offers five degrees in law, with several combined degree programmes with other University of Toronto faculties.

JD program 

The Juris Doctor or JD degree is the faculty's undergraduate level of a professional law degree, with about 200 students in every class and 600 in total. Students require an undergraduate degree prior to admission and must take the LSAT. In 2001, the Faculty of Law became the first law school in Canada to offer the Juris Doctor (JD) designation rather than the Bachelor of Laws (LLB). It followed many law schools in the United States, which had phased out the LLB over the 20th Century. The JD designation is intended to reflect the fact that the vast majority of the school's graduates enter the law school with at least one university degree. (In fact, approximately one quarter enter with one or more graduate degrees.) The JD designation does not, however, reflect significant changes in the law school's curriculum. The move to the JD was controversial at the time it was announced, though it has now gained wide acceptance and has been emulated by almost all Canadian law schools. Graduates of the faculty's JD programme are academically qualified to teach law at most law schools in North America, though an extensive record of legal publications is usually an additional prerequisite for tenure-track employment. Despite its name, holders of the JD are not legally entitled to use the prefix Doctor, unlike other professional doctorates (e.g., MD, PharmD, DDS) offered by the university.

Combined JD programs 

In addition to the regular JD program, the faculty offers the most combined law degrees in Canada. Students concurrently pursue their JD with a second degree from another faculty at the university. These include the JD/MBA (business) with the Rotman School of Management, JD/MGA (international organizations) and JD/MPP (government) with the Munk School of Global Affairs and Public Policy, JD/MSW (social work) with the Factor-Inwentash Faculty of Social Work, and the JD/MA and JD/Ph.D. (arts and science) with the Faculty of Arts and Science, among others. While about one-fifth of the class currently is enrolled in a combined program, the most popular is the JD/MBA with an enrollment of over 20 students per year, making up over 10% of the overall JD class. Its combined JD/MBA program is the largest in Canada and possibly the world with students pursuing careers in business law, corporate leadership, consulting and investment banking.

LLM program 

The Master of Laws (LLM) is a one-year degree that can be taken in either a thesis-intensive format or a coursework-only format. The Faculty offers concentrations in the area of Business Law, Criminal Law, Legal Theory, and Health Law, Ethics and Policy within the LLM degree program. Each year there are about 50 LLM students, with admission being restricted to students with outstanding academic performance in their first law degree (i.e., JD or LLB).

GPLLM program 

The Global Professional Master of Laws (GPLLM) is a 12-month executive-style master of laws offered during evenings and weekends and taught by a combination of law and business faculty. The Faculty offers concentrations in the area of Business Law, Canadian Law in a Global Context, Innovation, Law and Technology, and Law of Leadership. Each year there are about 80 GPLLM students. Prior legal education is not required for admission, and the degree is designed for working professionals in occupations closely aligned with the law but not legal in nature.

MSL program 

The Master of Studies in Law (MSL) is a very small program designed for established academics and scholars who work and write in a discipline related to law, and wish to acquire a knowledge of the law in order to add a legal dimension to scholarship in their own discipline.

SJD program 

The Doctor of Juridical Science (SJD) is a research doctorate degree aimed at aspiring scholars. The SJD program provides an opportunity for outstanding law graduates to pursue original academic research at the highest level in a focused area of law. The programme includes graduate legal coursework and a 90,000 – 100,000 word dissertation that makes an original contribution to legal scholarship. Eligible candidates generally hold a Bachelor of Laws (LLB) or Juris Doctor (JD) and a Master of Laws (LLM) from recognized universities with an excellent academic record and have demonstrated, through substantive writing, their ability to engage in and generate high-level thought and quality research. While common in the United States, the University of Toronto is the only university in Canada to offer the SJD as its terminal law degree. All other Canadian universities offer a Ph.D. in law, while the University of Ottawa grants a Doctor of Laws (LL.D) as its terminal degree. Under Ontario law, holders of the SJD are entitled to use the prefix "Doctor" with their name.

Legal clinics and internships 
The Faculty of Law offers its students internship programs in pro bono work and international human rights law, and supports a range of legal clinics staffed by students as well as practitioners.

Tuition and financial aid
Total tuition and other fees for entering Juris Doctor (JD) students as of 2020-21 are $34,633.51. The Faculty of Law has, by far, the highest tuition fees of any law school in Canada. It also has a financial aid program, which 48% of students qualified for in 2015-2016, with the average first-year student who qualified for aid receiving a $9,132 bursary.

All students who have eligible unmet need, according to the financial aid policy, receive assistance in the form of bursaries and Faculty interest payments on private loans during the three years of law school. The Faculty's financial aid program uses a "deemed parental contribution" as part of determining a student's unmet need. There is no deemed parental contribution below an income threshold that is around the average Canadian household income. The deemed parental contribution phases out for students above the age of 30.

The Faculty of Law is the only law school in Canada with a back-end debt relief program for graduates who choose to pursue low income employment. The "back end debt relief program" is targeted to relieve debt with respect to financial aid/interest-free loans that are recognized by the faculty; most third-party debt (lines of credit; credit cards; mortgage debt) is not recognized and is not eligible for faculty support.

Grading system 
The JD program uses a modified honours-pass-fail grading system, announced in 2011–2012 and implemented in 2012–2013. It followed on Harvard Law School's and Stanford Law School's implementation announced in 2008-2009 and 2007-2008, respectively, of a modified pass-fail system first brought in place by Yale Law School decades before in the 1960s. The grades awarded are High Honours (HH), Honours (H), Pass with Merit (P), Low Pass (LP) and Fail (F). Toronto along with Harvard, Stanford, and Yale as well as UC Berkeley which has also had a similar system for decades, are the only law schools that use modified pass-fail systems in North America. Students beginning law school prior to 2012 are grand-parented and continue to be graded under a modified letter grade system. Students hoping to graduate with 'distinction,' indicating they finished in the top 10% of their class, can expect to require a mix of High Honours (HH) and Honours (H) grades.

Cheating scandal 
In 2001, 30 U of T law students were caught misrepresenting their grades in order to secure competitive positions at Canada's leading law firms, known collectively by the metonym of Bay Street – the street in downtown Toronto where most are located. Many of these students were suspended from the law school for a year as a result of their actions.

Student organizations 
Students manage a wide range of organizations and activities at the Faculty of Law. Activities include free legal clinics such as Downtown Legal Services, mooting, law journals, and interest oriented clubs. The umbrella organization for JD students at the Faculty of Law is the Students' Law Society. The umbrella organization for graduate students is the Graduate Students' Law Society. The student societies act as student governments, providing funding to student organizations and advocating on behalf of students to the faculty and administration.

The four student-run law journals at the Faculty are:
University of Toronto Faculty of Law Review
Journal of International Law and International Relations
Journal of Law and Equality
Indigenous Law Journal

Post-graduation employment 
The Faculty has the highest employment rate and average starting salaries for legal graduates in the country, taking the largest proportion of positions at Bay Street Seven Sisters firms in Canada every year. Over 95% of the school's JD graduates secure legal employment (as articling law students in Canada or licensed lawyers in jurisdictions where there is no apprenticeship such as the US) before graduation, the highest in the country.

Notable alumni

Justices of the Supreme Court of Canada
 Bora Laskin (1936) - Chief Justice of Canada (1973–1984)
 John C. Major (1957) - Puisne Justice of Supreme Court of Canada (1992–2005), Commissioner for the Air India Inquiry
 John Sopinka (1958) - Puisne Justice of the Supreme Court, (1988–1997)
 Ian Binnie (1965) - Puisne Justice of Supreme Court of Canada, (1998–2011)
 Louis LeBel (LLM 1966) - Puisne Justice of Supreme Court of Canada, (2000–2014)
 Rosalie Silberman Abella (1970) - Puisne Justice of Supreme Court of Canada (2004–Present)
 Michael J. Moldaver (1971) - Puisne Justice of Supreme Court of Canada (2011–Present)
 Russell Brown (2003) - Puisne Justice of Supreme Court of Canada (2015–Present)
 Sheilah Martin (2017) - Puisne Justice of Supreme Court of Canada (2017–Present)

Politicians
 Alfred Apps (1985) - President, Liberal Party of Canada (2009–2012)
 Jerry Grafstein (1954) - Senator (1984–2010)
 Karl Jaffary (1962) - Vice-President of the New Democratic Party (1969–1973), Toronto city alderman (1969–1974), and noted urban reformist.
 John Sewell (1964) - Mayor of Toronto (1978–1980), columnist
 Paul Martin (1964) - Prime Minister of Canada (2003–2006)
 Bill Graham (1964) - former Minister of Foreign Affairs, Minister of Defence, and interim Leader of the Opposition
 David Kilgour (1966) - democracy activist and former MP (who represented both the Progressive Conservative and Liberal parties)
 David Peterson (1967) - Premier of Ontario (1985–1990)
 Bob Rae (1977) - Premier of Ontario (1990–1995), Member of Parliament (1978–1982, 2008–present), Liberal Party of Canada foreign affairs critic
 David Miller (1984) - Mayor of Toronto (2003–2010)
 Tony Clement (1986) - Progressive Conservative MPP (1995–2003), Conservative Party MP (since 2006), and President of the Treasury Board (since 2011)

Lawyers
 John A. Tory (1952) - son of Torys LLP founder John S. D. Tory
 Alan Borovoy (1956) - general counsel for the Canadian Civil Liberties Association (1968–2009)
 Clayton Ruby (1969) - criminal lawyer

Scholars
 Martin Friedland (1958) - professor of criminal law, author
 Stephen Waddams (1967) - professor and noted private law theorist
 Robert Prichard (1975) - Dean of the Faculty of Law (1984–1990), President of the University of Toronto (1990–2000)
 Ronald J. Daniels (1986) - Dean of the Faculty of Law (1995–2005), Provost and Vice President, Academic of the University of Pennsylvania, and current President of Johns Hopkins University
 Kent Roach (1987) - professor and specialist in criminal and constitutional law
 Timothy Endicott (1988) - Dean of the Faculty of Law, University of Oxford (2007-2015), Professor of Legal Philosophy in the University of Oxford
 Benjamin Alarie (2002) - professor of law
 Ernest Weinrib - professor of law

Other
 Herbert Solway, QC (1955) - Chair of the Toronto Blue Jays
 Hal Jackman (1956) - Lieutenant Governor of Ontario (1991–1997), Chancellor of the University of Toronto (1997–2002)
 Allan Leibel (1970) - Canadian Olympic Sailor
 George Strathy (1974) - Chief Justice of Ontario (2014 - present)
 Stephen Stohn (1977) - television producer (Degrassi franchise)
 David Shore (1982) - television writer (House)
 Nigel S. Wright (1988) - businessman, chief of staff for Prime Minister Stephen Harper
 Guy Giorno (1989) - chief of staff for Premier of Ontario Mike Harris, chief of staff for Prime Minister Stephen Harper
 Ed Morgan (1984) - Judge and former professor
 Ralph Simmonds (1976), law lecturer at the University of Windsor, then McGill University, and then justice of the Supreme Court of Western Australia
 Garth Drabinsky (1973), Theatre Mogul, Co-Founder of Cineplex Theatres
 Melissa Kluger (2001), publisher and founder of Precedent magazine.

References

External links

Law
Toronto
Neoclassical architecture in Canada
1887 establishments in Ontario